Panchashikha, who appears in Shanti Parva (Book of Liberation) of Mahabharata (Chapter 218), was a long-lived disciple of Asuri who was a teacher of Samkhya Philosophy. As a follower of Kapila, Panchshikha was one of the earliest teachers of philosophy belonging to the Samkhya School of thought. He wrote a great number of works including 60000 verses concerning the nature of matter (Prakṛti), the nature of the self, the faculties of perception and action and supra normal powers. Shashti Tantra is believed to be his work. Uluka, nicknamed Kanada, the author of  Vaisheshika Sutra  and who taught Krishna, was a disciple of Panchashikha.

Dharmadhvaja Janaka, the king of Mithila, one of Panchshikha’s disciples, had asked Panchashikha about the relation between the body and the soul in the earthly life and after death. At several places, Vyasa, in his commentary on the Patañjali Yoga Sutras II.5, II.16, II.17 etc., by way of clarification, has specifically cited the opinions expressed by Panchashikha in respect of the nature of the body and the soul.

Kapha is believed to have fostered Panchshikha on her milk and thus emerged the Samkhya Philosophy. In the Vedic Tarpana Viddhi, the method of offering water, Panchashikha is revered in the process of Manushya tarpana, offering water to Original Men, in the mantra which reads:

औं संकश्च सनन्दश्च तृतीयश्च सनातनः
कपिलश्चासुरिश्चैव वोढुः पञ्चशिखस्तथा
सर्वे ते तृप्तिमायान्तु मद्दत्तेनाम्बुना सदा ||

"Let Sanaka, Sananda, Sanatana, Kapila, Asuri Bardhu and Panchshikha be all satisfied with the water offered by me."

References

Vedanta
Mahabharata